Meike de Bruijn (born 15 April 1970 in Amsterdam) is a road cyclist from Netherlands. She represented her nation at the 1995 UCI Road World Championships and 1997 UCI Road World Championships in the women's time trial. In 1995 she won a stage in the French stage race Laines-aux-Bois. In 1996 she won the silver medal at the Dutch National Road Race Championships. In the general classification of the 2000 Gracia–Orlová she finished second.

References

External links
 profile at cyclingarchives.com

1970 births
Dutch female cyclists
Living people
UCI Road World Championships cyclists for the Netherlands
Cyclists from Amsterdam
20th-century Dutch women
21st-century Dutch women